The Chancellor of Norway (modern Norwegian: Norges rikes kansler, "Chancellor of Norway's Realm") was the most important aide of the King of Norway during the Middle Ages, and during the Union with Denmark. He issued laws and regulations, and was responsible for day-to-day administration of the kingdom. From 1270, the Chancellor resided in Bergen. Haakon V of Norway moved the Chancellor's residence to Oslo; on 31 August 1314 the provost of St Mary's Church became Chancellor on a permanent basis. He was given the Great Seal of the Realm "for eternity." The Chancellors were originally chosen from the clergy but after 1542 the position was given to people from the nobility. The position lost its importance after Jens Bjelke's tenure, and was abolished in 1679.

Chancellors of Norway

Kingdom of Norway (872–1397)
Askatin, 1266–??
Torer Håkonsson, until 1276
Orm Merkesmann, 1276–1280
Bjarne Lodinsson, 1280–99?
Bård Bartholomoeus Serksson, 1299?–1305?
Ivar Olavsson, 1314–19
Arne Aslaksson, 1344–??
Pål Bårdsson
Pål Eriksson, 1318–
Henrik Vinaldsson, late 14th century

Kalmar Union
Arne Sigurdsson
Jens Jakobsson (Jon, Johannes) 1422–39
Gunnar Holk 1439?–48
Ivar Vikingsson, 1448–90
Erik Walkendorf, 1507–??
Mattis Hvørf, 1520–21
Hans Olsson, 1522–23
Mattis Hvørf, 1524–32

Denmark-Norway
Morten Krabbe (Nilsson), 1532–42
Per Herlogssenn
Niels Stub, 1546–47
Peder Huitfeldt, 1547–64
Niels Stub, 1564–65
Oluf Kalips (Pedersson), 1565–67
Johan Venstermand, 1567–72
Hans Pederssøn Litle (Basse), 23 June 1592 – 1603?
Henning Valstrup, 27 August 1603–04
Anders Lauritsson Green (Anders Lauritsson of Sundsby), 24 July 1604 – 1614
Jens Bjelke, 1614–48
Hannibal Sehested, 1648–60
Ove Bjelke, 8 December 1660–74
Johan Frederik von Marschalck, 1674–1679

References

Norwegian monarchy